Bakkasund is a village in Austevoll municipality in Vestland county, Norway. The village is located on the southeastern side of the island of Stora Kalsøy. Store-Kalsøy Chapel is located in the village, serving the northwestern part of Austevoll. Prior to the opening of the Bakkasund Bridge (connecting the island to Hundvåko island) in 1999, Bakkasund was the ferry port for the island of Stora Kalsøy, connecting it to several other islands in Austevoll.

References

Villages in Vestland
Austevoll